Ascot is a suburb of Perth, covering a narrow strip of land along the southern bank of the Swan River approximately  east of the Perth central business district. Its local government area is the City of Belmont.

The suburb, which was previously part of Belmont and Redcliffe, was officially established on 7 March 1991, with the boundaries being approved on 22 March 1991. It was named after the Ascot Racecourse, a major horse-racing track located within the suburb's boundaries.

Geography

See also
 Ascot Brick Works
 Ascot Water Playground
 Ron Courtney Island

References

External links
 Ascot Island - Rubbish to Recreation

 
Suburbs of Perth, Western Australia
Suburbs in the City of Belmont